The Kermadec rattail, Coelorinchus kermadecus, is a species of rattail found around New Zealand including the Kermadec Islands at depths of between 1,100 and 1,200 m.  Its length is about 40 cm.

References
 
 Tony Ayling & Geoffrey Cox, Collins Guide to the Sea Fishes of New Zealand,  (William Collins Publishers Ltd, Auckland, New Zealand 1982) 

Macrouridae
Endemic marine fish of New Zealand
Fauna of the Kermadec Islands
Fish described in 1904
Taxa named by David Starr Jordan